CSS Nashville was a large side-wheel  steam casemate ironclad built by the Confederates late in the American Civil War.

Description
The side wheels were powered by two steam engines with a  bore and a  stroke. She was armed with three  Brooke rifles and a 24-pounder howitzer.

Construction and career
Nashville was laid down at Montgomery, Alabama, because of the availability of riverboat engines there. Launched in mid-1863, Nashville was taken to Mobile, Alabama, for completion in 1864. Her first commander was Lieutenant Charles Carroll Simms, CSN.

Still fitting out, she took no part in the Battle of Mobile Bay on 5 August 1864. She helped fend off attacks on Spanish Fort, Alabama, on 27 March 1865, supported Confederate commander Randall L. Gibson until driven away by Federal batteries, and shelled Federal troops near Fort Blakely on 2 April 1865. The ships retreated up the Tombigbee River 10 days later when Mobile surrendered. She was one of the vessels formally surrendered by Commodore Ebenezer Farrand, CSN, at Nanna Hubba Bluff on 10 May 1865.

Although never quite finished, she had been heavily armored with triple 2-inch plating forward and around her pilot house, only a single thickness aft and there had been some doubts expressed that her builders might have overestimated her structural strength. Rear Admiral Henry K. Thatcher, USN, wrote on June 30, 1865, after survey, "She was hogged when surrendered and is not strong enough to bear the weight of her full armor." He was certain "she could not live in a seaway."

Following her surrender, Nashville was laid up until 22 November 1867, when she was sold for scrap at New Orleans, Louisiana, her armor having previously been stripped for reuse in other vessels.

Commanders
 Lieutenant Charles Carroll Simms (1864)
 Lieutenant John W. Bennett (late 1864 - May 1865)

Notes

References
 
 
 
 

Nashville-class ironclads
Ships built in Alabama
1863 ships